The Breedon Everard Raceway (also known as Bulawayo Motorsport Park) is a motor racing circuit in Bulawayo, Zimbabwe. The circuit was built in 1969 when Zimbabwe was known as Rhodesia. The circuit hosted the Rhodesian Grand Prix on 3 occasions and hosted the Bulawayo 3 Hours sportscar race.

References

Bulawayo
Motorsport in Rhodesia
Motorsport in Zimbabwe